The 1999 Jordan League was the 48th season of Jordan Premier League, the top-flight league for Jordanian association football clubs. The championship was won by Al-Faisaly, while Kfarsoum, Al-Arabi, Al-Baqa'a, and Al-Torra were relegated. A total of 12 teams participated.

Teams

Map

League standings

References

Jordanian Pro League seasons
Jordan
Jordan
football